The Mitchigamea or Michigamea or Michigamie were a tribe in the Illinois Confederation. Not much is known about them and their origin is uncertain. Originally they were said to be from Lake Michigan, perhaps the Chicago area. Mitchie Precinct, Monroe County in Southwestern Illinois takes its name from their transient presence nearby, north of the French Fort de Chartres in the American Bottom along the Mississippi. One of their villages in the American Bottom, inhabited from 1730 until 1752, is one of the region's premier archaeological sites; it is known as the "Kolmer Site".

It is suggested that the people later moved to Arkansas under pressure from the Iroquois.  Their best-known chief was Agapit Chicagou.  Benjamin Drake, writing in 1848, records that the Michigamie, along with the other bands in the Illinois Confederation, had been attacked by a general confederation of the Sauk, Fox, Sioux, Chippewa, Ottawa, and Potawatamies, along with the Cherokee and Choctawa from the south.  The war continued for a great many years until the Illinois Confederation was destroyed.  Drake records that by 1826 only about 500 members of the Confederation remained.

Drake implies that the war came about due to the cruelty of the Illini towards their prisoners, frequently burning them, and even feasting on their flesh when killed.

The Jesuit Relations say: "At 5 miles from the village, I found the Tamaroa, who have
taken up their winter quarters in a fine Bay, where they await the Mitchigamea, -- who are
to come more than 60 leagues to winter there, and to form but one village with them."

Language
Their language was the Mitchigamea language.

References

External links
Lenville J. Stelle, Inoca Ethnohistory Project: Eye Witness Descriptions of the Contact Generation, 1667 - 1700

 
Great Lakes tribes
Illinois Confederation
Native American tribes in Illinois
Native American tribes in Michigan
Siouan peoples